Ray Halcomb Ballard (April 6, 1897 – October 1970) was an American college football and basketball player and coach. He served as the head football coach at Northeastern State University from 1925 to 1927.

Head coaching record

References

1897 births
1970 deaths
Basketball coaches from Oklahoma
Northeastern State RiverHawks athletic directors
Northeastern State RiverHawks football coaches
Northwestern Oklahoma State Rangers football players
Phillips Haymakers athletic directors
Phillips Haymakers football coaches
Phillips Haymakers men's basketball coaches
People from Woodward, Oklahoma